Julia Janssen (1900–1982) was a German stage actress. She also appeared in several films.

Selected filmography 
 The Woman of Yesterday and Tomorrow (1928)
 Heaven on Earth (1935)
 William Tell (1956)

References

Bibliography 
 von Dassanowsky, Robert. Austrian Cinema: A History. McFarland, 2005.

External links 

1900 births
1982 deaths
German film actresses
German stage actresses
Actors from Dortmund